Loren Gold is an American keyboardist, vocalist, music director, and songwriter. Gold is the keyboardist and backup vocalist for The Who, and keyboardist/vocalist for the band Chicago. In addition, Loren has been the touring keyboardist and backup vocalist for Roger Daltrey since 2009.  Loren also performs with Rita Wilson, and has toured regularly  with Don Felder since 2009.  Other artists he has toured with include Kenny Loggins, Natalie Maines, and American Idol winner Taylor Hicks. Gold has been musical director for pop stars Selena Gomez, Demi Lovato, and Hilary Duff, and he continues to build and develop bands for other artists. Gold has published two instructional books through his collaboration with Alfred Music, and his original compositions have been featured on HBO and Showtime.

Music Director
Gold toured in fall 2003 as the keyboard player for Hilary Duff, and continued as her musical director until 2007. In winter 2007, Gold co-wrote with the Canadian songwriter James Renald the first single for the American Idol winner Taylor Hicks, entitled "The Runaround". Television and national performances of "The Runaround" took place starting in December 2006. Gold became the musical director and keyboard player for Taylor, touring extensively in 2007. In 2008, Gold toured with Mandy Moore in support of her album, Wild Hope in Australia and the Philippines. In winter 2008/2009, he continued playing keyboards with the NBC production America's Got Talent and ABC's Dancing with the Stars.

In 2008–09, Gold became music director and consultant for several pop artists, including Demi Lovato, Jordan Pruitt, Jordin Sparks and Selena Gomez. During spring 2008, Gold began performing with Don Felder of the Eagles, shortly followed as keyboardist / vocalist for Kenny Loggins. An original Gold/Renald composition, entitled "Pretend", was used in the 2009 Walden Media film Bandslam and featured on its soundtrack, available on Hollywood Records.

Roger Daltrey

In 2009, Gold became the keyboard player and vocalist for Roger Daltrey's Use It or Lose It Tour. Daltrey's band, No Plan B, also opened for Eric Clapton on several dates during 2010. At the show of October 12, 2009, in Seattle, Pearl Jam singer Eddie Vedder joined the band on stage for performances of Pearl Jam's "Better Man", and the Who's "The Real Me" and "Bargain".

In December 2010, Gold was asked to be Musical Director for the Phil Kennemore Y&T benefit concert in Santa Clara, CA.  Gold performed with several guests, including Geoff Tate of Queensrÿche, Don Dokken of Dokken, and Vinny Appice of Dio and Black Sabbath.

In 2011, there were performances of the Who's Tommy and the hits of the Who, which included a performance for the Teenage Cancer Trust at Royal Albert Hall with Pete Townshend. On March 28, 2012, the band was joined on stage by Steve Winwood, Ronnie Wood, Paul Weller, Kelly Jones and Michael Miley for another Royal Albert Hall performance for the Teenage Cancer Trust. A world tour of Tommy continued throughout 2011–2012 with North America, Europe, and Japan.

The Who

In July 2012, the Who announced Gold as keyboardist / backing vocalist on their 2012–2013 35-date Quadrophenia and More tour, where they played their album Quadrophenia in its entirety. The tour continued in the summer of 2013 with performances throughout Europe, concluding with a performance at Wembley Arena in London. Between the two legs of the tour, Gold performed at 12-12-12: The Concert for Sandy Relief – a benefit concert that took place on December 12, 2012, at Madison Square Garden in New York City. In addition to the Who, performers included Paul McCartney, the Rolling Stones, Billy Joel, Bruce Springsteen, and Roger Waters. It was the most widely distributed live musical event in history, accessible to nearly two billion people worldwide on television, radio and the Internet.

Prior to joining the band, Gold worked with the Who on their 2010 Super Bowl Halftime performance, helping edit and organize the arrangement of the performance.

Between performances with Roger Daltrey and the Who, Gold traveled to Japan and performed with veteran Tsuyoshi Nagabuchi.  The tour, entitled "Arena Tour 2014 All Time Best," celebrated a career that has spanned over 30 years. Performances included the legendary Nippon Budokan in Tokyo and Yokohama arena.  A live DVD was released following the tour.  A final concert was added in 2015 at Mt Fuji, with 100,000 people in attendance.

In 2014, the Who announced The Who Hits 50! world tour, to celebrate the 50th anniversary of the band.  The tour kicked off in the United Arab Emirates, at a concert after the Abu Dhabi Grand Prix.  Just prior to the tour, the Who band appeared at London's Shepherd's Bush Empire on November 11 as part of the Who Hits 50 tribute night in aid of the Teenage Cancer Trust.  Gold performed and sang back-up vocals, alongside the rest of the Who band.  Performers included Wilko Johnson, Kaiser Chiefs' Ricky Wilson, Geddy Lee of Rush (band), Joe Elliott of Def Leppard, the Strypes, Tom Odell, Amy Macdonald, Andy Burrows and Rizzle Kicks. Ricky Wilson was joined by Phil Daniels, the star of the 1979 film Quadrophenia for 'Bell Boy', which was originally released in 1973.  Included during the 2015 tour were large, outdoor performances at Hyde Park and Glastonbury, with upwards of 200,000 people in attendance.

During a break between the Who's 2014-2015 world tour, Gold performed at the annual ARF Stars to the Rescue charity concert in January 2015, headed by Hall of Fame baseball manager Tony LaRussa.  In 2013, Gold also performed with several members of Santana and Bruce Hornsby at the annual charity event.  More ARF shows have followed, including performances with Huey Lewis and the News and Trace Adkins.

In May, 2015, Gold performed with the Who touring band at the MusiCares Foundation in New York City, honoring the Who’s Pete Townshend and its manager, Bill Curbishley, with an all-star line-up that included Bruce Springsteen, Joan Jett, Billy Idol, Willie Nile, and Who lead vocalist Roger Daltrey.

Gold was featured as the "Stadium Ace" in the April 2016 issue of Keyboard (magazine).

Chicago
In early August 2021, Loren Gold joined Chicago as a touring substitute when he was asked to fill in for their longtime keyboarist/vocalist Lou Pardini, when he was mostly out for August and September until he was able to return. In February 2022, Gold became an official member of the band after Pardini announced in late January that he was leaving the group after 13 years.

Artists
Gold has recorded and/or worked with the Who, Roger Daltrey, Chicago, Pete Townshend, Kenny Loggins, Natalie Maines, Huey Lewis and the News, Tsuyoshi Nagabuchi, Eddie Vedder, Trace Adkins, Steve Winwood, Don Felder, Melissa Etheridge, Rita Wilson, Hilary Duff, Taylor Hicks, Mandy Moore, Tate McRae, America's Got Talent, Dancing with the Stars, Demi Lovato, Selena Gomez, Eric McCormack, Jordan Pruitt, Nick Lachey, Jordin Sparks, Gladys Knight, Dan Aykroyd, Andrew Gold, Y&T, Kara DioGuardi, Andrew Dice Clay and others.

Awards
American Idol Season Five (Gold Record Award)
Taylor Hicks (Gold Record Award)
Demi Lovato (Gold Record Award)
Selena Gomez (Gold and Platinum Awards)
Hilary Duff (Multi-Platinum Awards)

Network Television Appearances
The Tonight Show, Oprah Winfrey, The Late Show, MTV, The Ellen DeGeneres Show, The Today Show, Good Morning America, Jimmy Kimmel, CBS Early Show, Martha Stewart, Dr Phil, Carson Daly, American Music Awards, Billboard Awards, The Talk.

DVD / Television / Film / Live Albums 
Quadrophenia Live in London, The Who Tommy Live At Albert Hall, The Who Live In Hyde Park, The Who 2017 Tommy & More, The Imitation Game, Bandslam, The Girl Can Rock, Melrose Place, Beverly Hills, 90210, Learning to Fly, HBO, Showtime, Cinemax, The Movie Channel, Nickelodeon, Tsuyoshi Nagabuchi, All Night Live, Tsuyoshi Nagabuchi, FUJI SANREI ALL NIGHT LIVE 2015(5CD+DVD)

Works

In 2015, Gold released his first instructional book for Alfred Music.  Entitled Sitting In: Blues Piano, it features backing tracks and improv lessons, and includes progressions in essential blues styles, like boogie woogie, shuffle, gospel, blues-rock, swing blues, and others. Audio recordings contain sample solos, while the book provides tips focusing on scales, modes, comping patterns, and other ideas for developing an authentic blues vocabulary. The recordings feature a live band with piano, guitar, bass, harmonica, and drums.

A second book released in 2016, entitled Sitting In: Rock Piano'', follows a similar format to the blues book.

Gold also composes music which falls into the Instrumental genre. Selected works include: Keys, All Around Me

References

External links
 Official Web Site

Place of birth missing (living people)
Living people
Musicians from Palo Alto, California
New-age composers
No Plan B (band) members
The Who members
American rock keyboardists
American soul keyboardists
21st-century American keyboardists
20th-century American keyboardists
American pop keyboardists
American rhythm and blues keyboardists
Chicago (band) members
Year of birth missing (living people)